The 2000–01 NBA season was the Timberwolves' 12th season in the National Basketball Association. After the tragic death of Malik Sealy, the Timberwolves scrambled to find a replacement for him, signing free agent Chauncey Billups, a close friend of Kevin Garnett, and signing LaPhonso Ellis during the off-season. Meanwhile, the Timberwolves secret free agent deal signed by Joe Smith was voided by the NBA, who ruled their proper procedure in signing the contract, while stripping their first round draft picks for the next five seasons and fined the team $3.5 million; Timberwolves owner Glen Taylor, and General Manager Kevin McHale were both suspended for one year. Smith would later on sign a free-agent deal with the Detroit Pistons.

Despite the troubles, and losing four of their first six games, the Timberwolves won 13 of their next 18 games, posted an 11-game winning streak between January and February, and held a 32–18 record at the All-Star break. At midseason, the team signed free agent Felipe López, who was previously released by the Washington Wizards. The Timberwolves finished fourth in the Midwest Division with a 47–35 record.

Garnett averaged 22.0 points, 11.4 rebounds, 5.0 assists, 1.4 steals and 1.8 blocks per game, and was named to the All-NBA Second Team, NBA All-Defensive First Team, and selected for the 2001 NBA All-Star Game. In addition, second-year star Wally Szczerbiak averaged 14.0 points and 5.5 rebounds per game, and won the MVP award in the Rookie-Sophomore Game during the All-Star Weekend, while Terrell Brandon provided the team with 16.0 points, 7.5 assists and 2.1 steals per game, Anthony Peeler contributed 10.5 points per game, Billups contributed 9.3 points and 3.4 assists per game, and Ellis provided with 9.4 points and 6.0 rebounds per game off the bench. Garnett also finished in fifth place in Most Valuable Player voting with 1 first-place vote, and finished in second place in Defensive Player of the Year voting, while Ellis finished in third place in Sixth Man of the Year voting.

However, in the Western Conference First Round of the playoffs, the T-Wolves would lose in four games to the top-seeded San Antonio Spurs. Following the season, Ellis signed as a free agent with the Miami Heat, and Tom Hammonds retired.

Draft picks

Roster

Regular season

Season standings

z - clinched division title
y - clinched division title
x - clinched playoff spot

Record vs. opponents

Game log

Playoffs

|- align="center" bgcolor="#ffcccc"
| 1
| April 21
| @ San Antonio
| L 82–87
| Kevin Garnett (25)
| Kevin Garnett (13)
| Terrell Brandon (8)
| Alamodome33,983
| 0–1
|- align="center" bgcolor="#ffcccc"
| 2
| April 23
| @ San Antonio
| L 69–86
| Kevin Garnett (18)
| Kevin Garnett (12)
| six players tied (2)
| Alamodome31,759
| 0–2
|- align="center" bgcolor="#ccffcc"
| 3
| April 28
| San Antonio
| W 93–84
| Kevin Garnett (22)
| Kevin Garnett (8)
| Terrell Brandon (9)
| Target Center17,676
| 1–2
|- align="center" bgcolor="#ffcccc"
| 4
| April 30
| San Antonio
| L 84–97
| Wally Szczerbiak (20)
| Kevin Garnett (15)
| Terrell Brandon (6)
| Target Center16,336
| 1–3
|-

Player statistics

NOTE: Please write the players statistics in alphabetical order by last name.

Season

Playoffs

Awards and records
 Kevin Garnett, All-NBA Second Team
 Kevin Garnett, NBA All-Defensive First Team

Transactions

References

See also
 2000-01 NBA season

Minnesota Timberwolves seasons
2001 in sports in Minnesota
2000 in sports in Minnesota
Monnesota